Francis Sydney Moran (3 October 1883 – 20 October 1949) was an Australian rules footballer who played with Geelong in the Victorian Football League (VFL).

References

External links 

1883 births
1949 deaths
Australian rules footballers from Victoria (Australia)
Geelong Football Club players
East Geelong Football Club players